In professional wrestling, a cutter is a  facelock neckbreaker maneuver. This move sees an attacking wrestler first apply a  facelock (reaching back and grabbing the head of an opponent, thus pulling the opponent's jaw above the wrestler's shoulder) before falling backwards (sometimes after running forwards first) to force the opponent face-first to the mat below.

The cutter was innovated by Johnny Ace, who called it the Ace Crusher. It was later popularized by Diamond Dallas Page, who called it the Diamond Cutter, which is where the move got its name. The most famous of all the cutters is the R.K.O, the finishing move of Randy Orton. The cutter also formed the base for the later development of another professional wrestling move known as the stunner.

Variations

Argentine cutter
The attacking wrestler gets the opponent in the Argentine backbreaker position as to execute the Argentine Backbreaker drop. The attacking wrestler then pushes the opponent's legs so that they flip horizontally 180 degrees. As the opponent's weight is being shifted to one side, the attacking wrestler applies the  facelock and drops the opponent.

Back suplex cutter
This variation sees the wrestler lift an opponent from behind as with a belly to back suplex. Then, instead of falling backwards, the wrestler pushes the opponent's legs so that the opponent turns over in mid-air, so that they are now face-down and parallel to the ground. As the opponent falls, the wrestler reaches back and seizes the opponent's head in order to perform the cutter.

Crucifix cutter
In this version, the wrestler first lifts the opponent up in a crucifix hold before rotating them into the cutter. Another variation involves the opponent lifted in a reverse crucifix and dropped into the cutter. This particular version was innovated and popularized in America by Tommy Dreamer, who called it the TommyHawk.

Diving cutter
In this version, a wrestler dives from the top rope and nails a cutter to a standing opponent from the front. There is also a springboard version in which the wrestler dives from the ropes in a backflip position and delivers a cutter to the standing opponent. Chris Bey uses this move, calling it The Art of Finesse.

Elevated cutter

With an opponent placed on an elevated surface, a wrestler applies a  facelock and then draws the opponent away, leaving only the opponent's feet over the elevated surface. The wrestler then falls backwards so that the opponent is forced to dive forward onto the top of their head due to the angle at which they are dropped. The elevated cutter can also be performed as a double team maneuver, including several variations such as the doomsday-style elevated cutter and the 3D. It is used by Danny Burch and Nigel McGuinness.

Fireman's carry cutter

Also known as the TKO (short for Total Knock Out), and innovated by Marc Mero. It is another elevated cutter variation in which the opponent is first raised over the shoulders of a wrestler in the fireman's carry position. From here, the attacking wrestler twists the opposite way and quickly switches back, throwing the opponent's legs out backwards and drops down to the mat while taking hold of the opponent's head to force them to fall into a high impact cutter. Nikki Bella used this move, calling it Rack Attack 2.0. Scorpio Sky and Sanada use this move, calling it TKO. WWE wrestler Austin Theory uses this move, calling it ATL while Karl Anderson uses this move, naming it Swivel Gun Stun. This move was also used by former FCW/NXT/WWE superstar Alex Riley calling this move "You're Dismissed".

Forward somersault cutter
A standing variation of the Diamond Dust in which the attacking wrestler jumps forward into a somersault over a seated or kneeling opponent while applying an inverted facelock, landing back-first with the opponent's face driven into the mat. A stunner variation is also possible. This move was innovated by Jason Kincaid, calling it Grave of the Fireflies. Jillian Hall used this move at one point. WWE wrestler Charlotte Flair uses this move as her finisher, calling it Natural Selection. Cody Rhodes during his tenure as "Stardust" used this move as a signature move.

Front facelock cutter
This cutter variation sees the wrestler first lock the opponent in a front facelock or an inverted front facelock. The wrestler then pivots 180° and catches the opponent in a  facelock with their free arm before falling down into the cutter. This move is commonly known as the Twist of Fate, and is associated with Jeff and Matt Hardy, as well as their former teammate, Lita.

Handspring cutter
The wrestler performs a handspring and, as they jump backwards, they grab their opponent in a  facelock and fall backwards, dropping the opponent face-first into the mat. It is used by Penelope Ford, Fénix and Jay Lethal.

Inverted suplex cutter
This variation sees the attacking wrestler execute an inverted suplex lift on the opponent before bringing them down face first with the cutter. Also known as the Osaka Street Cutter.

Jumping cutter 
This cutter variation sees the wrestler jumping towards the opponent and grabbing the opponent's head in a  facelock while parallel to the ground, and then slamming the opponent's face to the mat in a cutter. This move is popularized by Randy Orton as his finishing move called RKO. Karl Anderson and Tama Tonga use this variation, named the Gun Stun. Matt Riddle has used the RKO since he started teaming with Randy Orton.

Over-the-shoulder cutter 
Also known as a powerslam cutter, this variation sees the wrestler lifting the opponent onto their shoulders as in a front powerslam. Then, as the opponent is on the shoulder, the wrestler holds the head of the opponent and jumps and slams the opponent face-first to the mat in a cutter. The facebuster variation also exists.

Over-the-shoulder flip cutter 
Also known as an Yokosuka cutter. In this variation, the wrestler first lifts the opponent so that they are lying face up across one of the wrestler's shoulders, as in a Canadian backbreaker rack, before flipping the opponent over into the cutter. It is common for the wrestler to not properly apply the  facelock and the move to end up more in a DDT position. The move was innovated by Susumu Yokosuka and has since been used by several other wrestlers like Bobby Lashley and Buddy Murphy. This was also the finisher of former WCW and WWE Wrestler Chuck Palumbo as "Full Throttle".

Pop-Up cutter
The wrestler first pops the opponent up and then applies the  facelock and drops them into the cutter. It is used by Sanada which is also called TKO.

Rolling cutter 

This version of a cutter sees the wrestler place an opponent in an inverted facelock, then spinning under the opponent while holding the facelock, twisting them into the cutter position. This move has two major variants. The first is an inward rolling cutter, in which the attacking wrestler rolls under the opponent while using their free arm to grab the opponent's nearest free arm or strikes their back in an upward motion to power the move, is widely referred to as the Roll of the Dice and was popularized in North America by Reno and Christopher Daniels, the latter of whom calls it the Last Rites. Chris Hero also popularized the move as his finisher, called the Hero's Welcome. WWE wrestler Cody also uses this variation as a finisher, calling it Cross Rhodes. Damian Priest uses this move as his finisher, calling it The Reckoning. A modified version which involves hoisting the opponent off their feet before beginning the spin has also been used by other wrestlers. WWE wrestler Bo Dallas used this move, calling it Rollin' the Dice.

The second major variation, which is known as an outward rolling cutter and referred to as a Whirling Dervish in Japan, sees the wrestler spin in the opposite direction while holding onto the opponent's free arm while twisting for leverage. This is used by Tama Tonga as the Tongan Twist.

Running cutter
This variation occurs when the wrestler runs up to the distracted/stunned opponent, applies a  facelock while parallel to the ground, and then slams the opponent's face to the mat in a cutter.

Springboard cutter
This variation of the cutter occurs when the wrestler puts the opponent in the  facelock, then usually runs towards the ropes, then jumps onto the second or third rope to bounce off it, turning in the air to land the cutter. This move was popularized by Spike Dudley, originally calling it the Acid Drop, and later Dudley Dog in WWE. David Finlay uses this move as the Acid Drop.

Another variation of this cutter, called Sliced Bread Number 2, was popularized by Brian Kendrick. In this cutter the opponent and the attacker are in the corner, the attacker puts the opponent in the  facelock then runs up the turnbuckle, becoming vertical, then turns in mid-air to land the cutter. The move is similar to the shiranui.

There is a variation where both wrestlers faces the ropes or turnbuckle. The attacking wrestler runs and jumps on the ropes and bounces back. As they fall, they catch the opponent into a  facelock and drop them in the cutter. This variation is popularized by Will Ospreay and is called the OsCutter and is also used by Cody Rhodes, who calls it the Cody Cutter.

See also
Professional wrestling throws

References

Professional wrestling moves